Henderson Branch is a stream in Pike County in the U.S. state of Missouri. It is a tributary of Roundtop Branch.

Henderson Branch has the name of William Henderson, the original owner of the site.

See also
List of rivers of Missouri

References

Rivers of Pike County, Missouri
Rivers of Missouri